Flight 99 may refer to:
Aeroflot Flight 99, crashed on 11 November 1965
Wien Air Alaska Flight 99, crashed on 30 August 1975

0099